Veritas: The Quest is a television program that aired in 2003. It follows a rebellious but intelligent teenager, Nikko Zond, discovering that his father Solomon's profession is much more mystical and adventurous than he previously thought.  Solomon and his team (dubbed "Veritas," Latin for "truth") search for the answers to some of the world's mysteries, a quest began because of the mysterious disappearance of Nikko's mother during an archaeological dig. Thus begins Nikko's fantastical journey into an Indiana Jones-style adventure with his father and his colleagues in trying to follow in his mother's footsteps to discover what strange secrets she was uncovering.  The series was cancelled in the United States by ABC with only four episodes being aired. All thirteen produced episodes aired on Sci Fi Channel in the United Kingdom, on Rai 2 and Rai 4 in Italy, and Canal Sony (formerly known as Sony Entertainment Television).

This was the first program where Cobie Smulders had a series regular role, and notable guest stars included Liz Vassey, Carlo Rota, Roger Rees, and Eli Wallach.

Plot

The main protagonist of the series is Nikko Zond, a young teen, whose father is involved in many different archaeological expeditions ranging from Antarctica to harsh deserts. Nikko is at first reluctant to participate in many of the adventures, but throughout the series, it would appear that there is a hidden destiny for Nikko.

In the episode "Skulls", a mysterious figure (Conrad Dunn) appears out of nowhere, whom only Nikko can see, and guides Nikko. The episode ends with a crystal skull that is central to the plot of the episode modelled to reveal what someone would look like with skin and muscle added to that skull. The image formed matches the mysterious man who helped Nikko.

In the episode "Eternal," Nikko is poisoned and the only cure is for him to drink water that heals, and assures eternal life. While it is unknown if he gained eternal life or not, he did heal.

In the final episode, he suffered from hallucinations that led him to find a fragment of an artifact called the "Ring of Truth". Before the episode ends, he has another hallucination that reveals that the fragment of the "Ring" also joins with another fragment that his father had acquired earlier in the series. The episode ends with Nikko displaying telekinetic powers:  when he reaches for his soda, it slides across the table into his hand.

Episodes

See also
Bonekickers
Relic Hunter

External links
 
 
 

Television series by ABC Studios
American Broadcasting Company original programming
2003 American television series debuts
2003 American television series endings
Treasure hunt television series